Jacob Miller (born 22 August 1992) is an Australian professional rugby league footballer who plays as a  or  for the Castleford Tigers in the Betfred Super League.

He previously played for the Wests Tigers in the NRL. He has played for Wakefield Trinity and Hull F.C. in the Super League, and has also spent time on loan from Hull at Doncaster in the Kingstone Press Championship.

Background
Miller was born in Sydney, New South Wales, Australia.

Early years
Hailing from Ocean Shores, Miller played junior football with Mullumbimby Giants, winning a premiership with the Giants in the under 18s competition in 2007.
He was a pupil at Mullumbimby High School before he moved to Sydney and was a pupil at Matraville Sports High School when he was chosen as halfback for the Australian Schoolboys in 2009.

On a scholarship with the Sydney Roosters from age 14 onwards, Miller was released from the club as they had Todd Carney, Braith Anasta and Mitchell Pearce able to fill positions in the halves.

Playing career
Miller made his début with the Wests Tigers in round 4 of the 2011 NRL season, playing from the bench, and getting on the field with 20 minutes to go. He was only 18 at the time, and coach Tim Sheens said, "If you're good enough, you're old enough. And I think he's good enough." Two weeks later he made his first appearance in the run-on squad, playing as halfback in a match against the Gold Coast Titans, standing in for injured Robert Lui.

Besides NRL appearances, Miller played in the Wests Tigers' Toyota Cup team. He scored 5 tries and 128 points for the season, and was named as halfback in the competition's Team of the Year.

In round 4 of the 2012 season, Miller, after a late call up, scored his first NRL try. However, it was to be his only first grade appearance for the year. He finished the year by playing a "starring role" as Wests Tigers won the Under-20s grand final 46-6 against the Canberra Raiders. He then kicked six goals as he played five-eighth in the Junior Kangaroos squad that beat New Zealand 48-16.

Beginning the 2013 season as the Wests Tigers first choice of halfback, Miller started in the first 4 games of the season before being dropped to reserve grade for Braith Anasta. Weeks later it was announced Miller has been released and signed for Hull F.C. on a -year deal.

It was announced Miller would leave the club at the end of the 2014 season. He was subsequently signed by Wakefield Trinity for the 2015 season.

References

External links

Wakefield Trinity profile
SL profile

1992 births
Living people
People educated at Matraville Sports High School
Australian rugby league players
Combined Nationalities rugby league team players
Doncaster R.L.F.C. players
Hull F.C. players
Junior Kangaroos players
Newtown Jets NSW Cup players
Rugby league five-eighths
Rugby league halfbacks
Rugby league players from Sydney
Wakefield Trinity captains
Wakefield Trinity players
Wests Tigers players